James Shelton Dickinson (January 18, 1818 – July 23, 1882) was a prominent Confederate States of America politician.

He was born in Spotsylvania County, Virginia, and later moved to Alabama. He was a member of the Alabama State Senate from 1853 to 1855 and represented the state in the Second Confederate Congress.

References
 Political graveyard

1818 births
1882 deaths
Alabama state senators
People from Spotsylvania County, Virginia
Members of the Confederate House of Representatives from Alabama
19th-century American politicians